Giuseppe Bianchi was a musician and tenor who worked at the Jesuit Collegium Germanicum in Rome in the 17th century.  He was a student of Carissimi.

References 
 http://www.faculty.fairfield.edu/jmac/sj/cj/cj3music.html
 Culley, Thomas, S.J. Jesuits and Music. Rome: Jesuit Historical Institute, 1970, page 13 and 232-233
 Jean Lionnet, Performance Practice in the Papal Chapel during the 17th Century, Early Music -  Vol. 15, No. 1 (Feb., 1987), pp. 3–15
 Agnes Kory, Leopold Wilhelm and His Patronage of Music with Special Reference to Opera - Studia Musicologica Academiae Scientiarum Hungaricae > T. 36, Fasc. 1/2 (1995), pp. 11–25

Italian musicians
Italian tenors
Year of death unknown
Year of birth unknown